Jeremías Martín Rodríguez Puch (born 15 May 1999) is an Argentine footballer who plays as a midfielder for Académico de Viseu.

Career

As a youth player, Rodríguez joined the youth academy of River Plate, one of Argentina's most successful clubs, after a trial.

In 2020, he signed for Académico de Viseu in the Portuguese second division.

References

External links
 
 Jeremías Rodríguez at playmakerstats.com

Argentine footballers
Living people
Expatriate footballers in Portugal
1999 births
Académico de Viseu F.C. players
Liga Portugal 2 players
Argentine expatriates in Portugal
Argentine expatriate footballers
Association football midfielders